The 2017–18 Nemzeti Bajnokság I (known as the K&H női kézilabda liga for sponsorship reasons) is the 67th season of the Nemzeti Bajnokság I, Hungarian premier Handball league.

Teams
As in the previous season, 14 teams played in the 2017–18 season.
After the 2016–17 season, Mosonmagyaróvári KC SE and Kispest NKK were relegated to the 2017–18 Nemzeti Bajnokság I/B. They were replaced by two clubs from the 2016–17 Nemzeti Bajnokság I/B, Kecskeméti NKSE and Vasas SC.

Personnel and kits
Following is the list of clubs competing in 2017–18 Nemzeti Bajnokság I, with their president, head coach, kit manufacturer and shirt sponsor.

Managerial changes

League table

Schedule and results
In the table below the home teams are listed on the left and the away teams along the top.

Season statistics

Top goalscorers

Attendances

Updated to games played on 23 May 2018.
Source: League matches: NB I 2017/2018
Attendance numbers without playoff matches.

Number of teams by counties

See also
 2017–18 Magyar Kupa
 2017–18 Nemzeti Bajnokság I/B
 2017–18 Nemzeti Bajnokság II

References

External links
 Hungarian Handball Federaration 
 handball.hu

Nemzeti Bajnokság I (women's handball)
2017–18 domestic handball leagues
Nemzeti Bajnoksag I Women
2017 in women's handball
2018 in women's handball